"Punky Reggae Party" is a song by Bob Marley, recorded and released in 1977. Not appearing on any studio album, it was released in 1977 as a 12-inch single in Jamaica only on the Tuff Gong and Black Art labels, as a B-side to the "Jamming" single on the Island label in some countries and was later released as a live single on Babylon by Bus. Subsequently, it appeared on a number of compilations and "Best of" albums as well as the Deluxe Edition of Exodus and the 2002 CD reissue of Legend. The two versions of the song on the Jamaican 12-inch single were both featured on disc 2 of the Deluxe Edition of Exodus. The version featured on the 2002 CD reissue of Legend is the B-side version from the "Jamming" 12-inch single. There is also a version of the song released as a B-side on the "Jamming" 7-inch single which is much shorter.

The song was written by Bob Marley as a positive response to the release of a cover version of Junior Murvin's "Police and Thieves" by English punk band the Clash, on their first LP. Referring to the party of the title of the song, the lyrics mention several punk and reggae groups: "The Wailers will be there, the Damned, the Jam, the Clash – Maytals will be there, Dr. Feelgood too". Marley also often repeated the words "new wave" during the song. At one time, the list also included the Slits, but mention of them was removed allegedly because they were women.

According to a January 2014 interview with Midnight Raver, Sly Dunbar revealed that he played drums on this track. According to Dunbar, the drum track was recorded at Joe Gibbs studio.

The song was referred to in the Sublime song "Garden Grove" and the Robyn Hitchcock song "Antwoman".

Cover versions

In 2001, French punk band Burning Heads covered the song. It appeared on It's a Frenchy Ska Reggae Party Vol. 3 compilation.

In 2012, an American reggae band, Island Head, covered the song and named their debut album "Punky Reggae Party". Island Head musicians include Jamaican guitarist Mikey "Mao" Chung who is known for being part of the Peter Tosh band, and Andy Bassford, known for playing with Dennis Brown and Toots and the Maytals. Island Head's bandleader/producer Billy Messinetti played drums and percussion, David Frank of the band the System played all of the keyboards, trumpet player Don Harris is co-producer, Timmy Cappello played saxophone and Neil Jason (Brecker Brothers Band) played bass.

Track listing 
1977 12" single
 "Punky Reggae Party" – 9:19
 "Punky Reggae Version" – 8:49

References

1977 songs
1977 singles
Songs about parties
Songs about punk
Songs about reggae
Bob Marley songs
Songs written by Bob Marley